The Office of the Arab League in London (or, formally, the League of Arab States) is the diplomatic mission of the Arab League in the United Kingdom.

Background 
The Council of the Arab League passed a resolution on 26 March 1959 to establish an office for the League in London. The office officially opened its doors in 1961 with the main aim to foster and promote relationship between the League and the United Kingdom at all levels. The Office also serves as a forum for the Arab Ambassadors Council in London, to coordinate policy positions and to jointly consider all matters of common concern in the United Kingdom.

Responsibilities 

 To engage with the UK government in discussing of issues of  Arab and mutual interest.
 To maintain contact at the highest level with leaders of the political parties and participate in party conferences.
 To foster closer relations with the UK media both directly and through specialized bodies; 

- to respond appropriately to various positions regarding the Arab League,

-  to protect the Arab ‘image’ from prejudice and negative stereotyping, 

-   to promote a deeper understanding of the potentialities and possibilities generated by Arab integration in the UK and   internationally

 To support and encourage organisations and bodies that represent the Arab communities in the UK.

Gallery

References

External links
Official site

Arab League
Foreign relations of the Arab League
Grade II listed buildings in the City of Westminster
Buildings and structures in Marylebone